The Brewers–Cubs rivalry is a Major League Baseball (MLB) rivalry between the Milwaukee Brewers and Chicago Cubs. Both clubs are members of MLB's National League (NL) Central Division. The rivalry is also sometimes known as the I-94 Rivalry, because the two teams' ballparks are located only  from each other off Interstate 94 (I-94).

The Brewers and Cubs have been playing each other in spring training Cactus League games since the Brewers franchise began as the Seattle Pilots in 1969.  However, the rivalry did not begin until , when the Brewers moved from the American League (AL) Central Division to the National League Central. Until then, the Brewers had a rivalry with Chicago's AL team, the White Sox.

The Brewers-Cubs rivalry has been ranked among the best and most competitive in baseball. The teams have never met in the postseason.

Background

1997–1998: First meetings
The Brewers and Cubs met for the first official time on June 13, 1997 in interleague play, a 4–2 Brewers victory at Wrigley Field in Chicago. They met for the first time as division rivals on June 15, 1998, a 6–5 Cubs victory also in Wrigley Field.

1999–2016: Geographic foes and division races
After battling for the NL Central title in both 2007 and 2008, the teams met at Miller Park for the Brewers' home opener in 2009. During the second game of the series on April 11, the Brewers had the highest attendance in Major League Baseball for the rivalry game.

During games in Milwaukee, it was sometimes common for there to be many Cubs fans in attendance. This has been largely due to the ticket availability at Miller Park; Wrigley Field has routinely sold out in the past, so it has often been easier and cheaper for Cubs fans to watch games at Miller Park (with Amtrak's Hiawatha Service providing low-cost access between both cities and trains often packed during rivalry games either way), leading Cubs fans to call Miller Park by the derisive nickname of "Wrigley North". During the 2006 season, the Milwaukee Brewers started the "Take Back Miller Park" campaign to regain home field advantage. Since then, the dominating presence of Cubs fans has somewhat dwindled as the Brewers have become more popular with local fans following the sale of the team from Bud Selig to Mark Attanasio. Through the 2007 and 2008 seasons, the rivalry became more intense with both teams battling for the National League Central crown, a prize the Cubs eventually claimed both seasons. During 2008, the Brewers had a sellout streak going at the start of a mid-July series at home against the Cubs.

The rivalry was less prominent in the early 2010s, as both teams finished well out of playoff contention in 2010, while in 2011 the Brewers claimed the NL Central title and the Cubs struggled to a 71–91 record.

The Brewers in 2012, won 13 of 17 games against the Cubs to take the all-time series at 118–117.

2017–Present
In 2017, a surprisingly competitive Brewers team led by young prospects and resurgent veterans challenged the defending World Series champion Cubs for the division, the two played in a key end of the season series which led to the Cubs clinching their second division crown in a row, finishing the season 92–70, six games ahead of the 86–76 Brewers.

The rivalry reached a pivotal stage in 2018. After narrowly missing the playoffs in 2017, the Brewers made several acquisitions during the off-season. They signed free agent outfielder Lorenzo Cain and acquired former Miami Marlins outfielder Christian Yelich in a blockbuster trade. These acquisitions, both occurring on January 25, 2018, helped the Brewers match the Cubs in terms of offensive prowess. 
During the regular season, the Cubs won eight of first nine meetings, but the Brewers ended up winning the last four series against the Cubs and both teams were tied for first place in the NL Central after 162 games. The teams faced off in a tie-breaker game for the division title. Milwaukee won 3–1, winning the division and securing home-field advantage throughout the National League playoffs. The Brewers also enjoyed a large contingent of Brewers fans at Wrigley Field during this game, which marked a turn in a series where Cubs fans normally "took over" Miller Park. The Cubs were relegated to the Wild Card Game, which they lost to the Colorado Rockies.  The Brewers went on to beat the Rockies in the NLDS but lost to the Los Angeles Dodgers in the NLCS.

Season-by-season results

|-
| 
| style=";" | Cubs
| style=";" | 2–1 
| no games 
| Cubs, 2–1
| 
|-
| 
| style=";" | Tie
| style=";" | 6–6 
| Tie, 3–3
| Tie, 3–3
| 
|-
| 
| style=";" | Tie
| style=";" | 6–6 
| 
| Tie, 3–3
|
|-

|-
| 
| style=";" | Brewers
| style=";" | 7–6 
| Brewers, 5–1 
| Cubs, 5–2
| 
|-
| 
| style=";" | Brewers
| style=";" | 9–8 
| Cubs, 4–3 
| 
| 
|-
| 
| style=";" | Brewers
| style=";" |  
| Brewers, 6–4
| Brewers, 4–3
| 
|-
| 
| style=";" | Cubs
| style=";" |  
| Cubs, 7–0
| Brewers, 6–3
| 
|-
| 
| style=";" | Cubs
| style=";" | 
| Tie, 5–5 
| Cubs, 5–2
| 
|-
| 
| style=";" | Brewers
| style=";" |  
| Brewers, 7–3
| Cubs, 4–2
| 
|-
| 
| style=";" | Tie
| style=";" |  
| 
| 
| 
|-
| 
| style=";" | Cubs
| style=";" | 9–6
| Cubs, 4–2
| Cubs, 5–4
| 
|-
|  
| style=";" | Cubs
| style=";" | 9–7
| Cubs, 5–2 
| Brewers, 5–4 
| Brewers clinched NL Wild Card and first postseason appearance since 1982 against the Cubs in game 162 of the regular season in Milwaukee with a victory along with a Mets' loss.
|-
| 
| style=";" | Cubs
| style=";" | 
| Cubs, 5–4
| Cubs, 5–3
| 
|-

|-
| 
| style=";" | Cubs
| style=";" | 9–6
| 
| 
| 
|-
| 
| style=";" | Brewers
| style=";" |  
| 
| 
| 
|-
| 
| style=";" | Brewers
| style=";" |  
| 
| 
| Cubs hire former Brewers manager Dale Sveum as manager.  Brewers win 10 straight home meetings (April 2011 – May 2012).
|-
| 
| style=";" | Brewers
| style=";" | 13–6
| 
| 
| MLB realignment results in teams meeting 19 times per season beginning in 2013.  
|-
| 
| style=";" | Cubs
| style=";" | 
| 
| 
| 
|-
| 
| style=";" | Cubs
| style=";" | 
| 
| 
| 
|-
| 
| style=";" | Cubs
| style=";" | 
| 
| 
| Cubs win 2016 World Series
|-
| 
| style=";" | Cubs
| style=";" | 
|  
| 
| 
|-
|  
| style=";" | Cubs
| style=";" |  
|  
| 
| Both teams were 95–67, tied atop the division after 162 games, so they played a tie-breaker game to determine the division champion.  The Brewers won the tie-breaker in Chicago, 3–1, to win the division, while the Cubs were relegated to the Wild Card Game.
|-
|  
| style=";" | Brewers
| style=";" | 
| 
| 
| 
|-

|-
| 
| Tie
| 5–5
| 
| 
| Season shortened to 60 games (with 10 meetings) due to COVID-19 pandemic. 
|-
|
| style=";" | Brewers
| style=";" | 
| 
| 
| 
|-
|
| style=";" | Cubs
| style=";" | 
| 
| 
| Last yr of 19 divisional games against each other. Balanced schedule starts in 2023 only 13 games against each other.
|-

|-
| Regular Season 
| style=";" | Brewers 
| style=";" | 
|  
|  
| 
|-

See also
Sports rivalries of the same cities/states:
Bears–Packers rivalry

References

Milwaukee Brewers
Chicago Cubs
Interleague play
Major League Baseball rivalries
Sports in the Midwestern United States